General elections were held in Liechtenstein on 14 June 1953. The Progressive Citizens' Party won eight of the 15 seats in the Landtag, but remained in coalition with the Patriotic Union.

Results

By electoral district

References

Liechtenstein
General
1953 06
Liechtenstein